Sir John Frederick, 4th Baronet (28 November 1708 – 9 April 1783), was a British politician who sat in the House of Commons between 1740 and 1763.
 
Frederick was the son of Governor of Fort St. David in the East Indies Sir Thomas Frederick, 3rd Baronet of Burwood Park Surrey, and his wife Leonora née Maresco).  He married  Susannah Hudson, daughter of Sir Roger Hudson, on 22 October 1741: their only son Frederick succeeded him. He was Member of Parliament for New Shoreham from 1740 to 1741; and for West Looe from 1743 to 1761.

References

1708 births
1783 deaths
People from Surrey
Members of the Parliament of Great Britain for English constituencies
British MPs 1734–1741
British MPs 1741–1747
British MPs 1747–1754
British MPs 1754–1761
Baronets in the Baronetage of Great Britain